Sami Uğurlu (born 27 April 1978) is a Turkish football manager and a former player.

Managerial career
Uğurlu had an unassuming playing career with Yozgatspor, Kardemir Karabükspor and İzmirspor in the TFF First League. After retiring as a player, he began as a youth coach at Altınordu. He move to Kasımpaşa as an assistant, and in December 2021 was appointed the head coach. On 20 May 2022, Uğurlu signed a 3-year contract with Kasımpaşa after collecting 39 points in his first 20 games with the club.

References

External links
 
 
 

1978 births
Living people
Footballers from İzmir
Turkish footballers
Turkish football managers
Kardemir Karabükspor footballers
İzmirspor footballers
TFF First League players
Kasımpaşa S.K. managers
Süper Lig managers
Association football defenders